Methylprednisolone suleptanate, sold under the brand names Medrosol and Promedrol, is a synthetic glucocorticoid corticosteroid and a corticosteroid ester—specifically, the C21 suleptanate 21-(8-(methyl-(2-sulfoethyl)amino)-1,8-dioxooctanoate) ester of methylprednisolone. It acts as a prodrug of methylprednisolone. Methylprednisolone suleptanate was developed as an improved alternative to methylprednisolone acetate (Depo-Medrol) with greater water solubility for use by intravenous administration.

See also
 List of corticosteroid esters § Methylprednisolone esters

References

External links
 Methylprednisolone suleptanate - AdisInsight

Alcohols
Corticosteroid esters
Glucocorticoids
Ketones
Pregnanes